The Manitoba Junior Hockey League (MJHL) expanded from four to six teams for the 1966–67 season when it readmitted the Brandon Wheat Kings and accepted the Selkirk Steelers. MJHL commissioner Jimmy Dunn announced his resignation on October 24, 1966, and cited personal reasons. Despite being offered a pay raise, he felt that the increase in teams made the job too much for him and had "taken the fun out of it". His resignation came shortly after a game between the Winnipeg Rangers and the Brandon Wheat Kings in which 242 penalty minutes were given in the first period.

Champion
On April 7 in Flin Flon, the Bombers won the MJHL championship and were presented with the Turnbull Memorial Trophy.

League notes
Brandon Wheat Kings and Flin Flon Bombers transfer from the Saskatchewan Junior Hockey League after the league folds.
The MJHL expands to Selkirk, with the Selkirk Steelers joining the league.
The Winnipeg Braves change their name to the St. James Braves.
Bobby Clarke (Flin Flon) set league records for most goals (71), assists (112), and points (183), in a single season.

Regular season

Flin Flon played 12 four point games, winning 10.
Monarchs & Rangers each won 1 four point game.
Some postponed games not played.

All-Star game
On February 24, the MJHL All-Stars played Canada's National Team at St. James.
MJHL Lineup:
Goal: Chris Worthy (Flin Flon); George Surmay (Rangers)  
Defence: Gerry Hart (Flin Flon); Jim Pritchard (Monarchs); Jack Criel (Flin Flon); Larry Brown (Brandon); George Sykes (Rangers)
Centre: Bobby Clarke (Flin Flon); Juha Widing (Brandon); Dezi Desrochers (Selkirk)
Leftwing: Cal Swenson (Brandon); Murray Klein (Rangers); Chuck Lefley (Rangers)  
Rightwing: Reggie Leach (Flin Flon); Bill Fairbairn (Brandon); Jim Benzelock (St. James)
Coach: Ed Dorohoy (Brandon)

Playoffs
Quarter-Finals
Brandon defeated St. James 3-games-to-none
Rangers defeated Selkirk 3-games-to-none
Semi-Finals
Flin Flon defeated Monarchs 3-games-to-none
Brandon defeated Rangers 4-games-to-1
Turnbull Cup Championship
Flin Flon defeated Brandon 3-games-to-2
Western Memorial Cup Semi-Final
Flin Flon lost to Port Arthur Marrs (TBJHL) 4-games-to-2

Awards

All-Star Teams

References

 Manitoba Junior Hockey League
 Manitoba Hockey Hall of Fame
 Hockey Hall of Fame
 Winnipeg Free Press Archives
 Brandon Sun Archives

MJHL
Manitoba Junior Hockey League seasons